Golden Eagles F.C. is a former Chitungwiza-based football club.

History 
The club was founded in February 2006 as Chitungwiza United, prior renamed on 31 August 2007 to Eagles F.C.. The club played since founding in the Division One in Zimbabwe. 2011 the club merged with Zimbabwe Saints F.C.

Youth Team 
Golden Eagles Fc youth team has won so much and have amazing youngsters like Adonai Sadomba and El-Shaddai Sadomba.. the team was started lead by Calistos Pasuwa.. with the likes of players like Thompson Mipande,Tagarika Nyenda, Masauso, Clemence Manezho from premier league side Dynamos fc on a loan from Golden Kopje in Chinhoi.. Tawanda Matanhike who later was signed by Gunners FC.. this young stars came from Seke 1 high school in Chitungwiza from there number one leader MR Chirapa.. they also trained played with players like Harvens Chinyama , Massey Zengeni, Coster Nhamoinesu, etc... Those where the players promising .... Then the club was later sold and changed the name to Eagles FC.. as there assistant was Loyd Mutasa.. former Dynamos player of all time

References

Chitungwiza
Football clubs in Zimbabwe
2006 establishments in Zimbabwe
Association football clubs disestablished in 2011
2011 disestablishments in Zimbabwe